I24 may refer to:
 
 Interstate 24
 , several submarines
 i24 News, an international news channel